Krivtsy is a rural locality (a village) in Svetlichanskoye Rural Settlement, Kosinsky District, Perm Krai, Russia. The population was 15 as of 2010. There are 2 streets.

Geography 
Krivtsy is located 46 km north of Kosa (the district's administrative centre) by road. Solym is the nearest rural locality.

References 

Rural localities in Kosinsky District